A.H.M. Noman Khan is a pioneer in mainstreaming persons with disabilities in the development process of Bangladesh. He was awarded the Ramon Magsaysay Award in 2010. He is the executive director of Centre for Disability in Development (CDD).

References

Ramon Magsaysay Award winners
Bangladeshi disability rights activists
Living people
Year of birth missing (living people)